Microthyris is a genus of pyraloid moths, belonging to the subfamily Spilomelinae of the grass moth family (Crambidae). The genus was first described by Julius Lederer in 1863.

Species
The genus includes the following species:

 Microthyris alvinalis (Guenée, 1854)
 Microthyris anormalis (Guenée, 1854)
 Microthyris asadias (Druce, 1899)
 Microthyris lelex (Cramer, 1777)
 Microthyris microthyralis (Snellen, 1899)
 Microthyris miscellalis (Möschler, 1890)
 Microthyris prolongalis (Guenée, 1854)

The following are junior synonyms of Microthyris:

 Crossophora Möschler, 1890 (non Meyrick, 1883: preoccupied)
 Grossophora (lapsus)
 Cyclocena Möschler, 1890

Footnotes

References

Spilomelinae
Crambidae genera
Taxa named by Julius Lederer